"Hands" is a charity single recorded by various artists as tribute to victims of the Orlando nightclub shooting. It was written by Justin Tranter, Julia Michaels, and BloodPop, and produced by the latter and Mark Ronson. All of the song's proceeds benefited the families affected during the shooting, and helped cover medical costs and counseling efforts. The song was written a day after the mass shooting occurred.

Approximately 27 artists assisted in the making of "Hands", which was released for download on July 6, 2016. Interscope Records handled the release, allowing artists to use the studios most convenient to them. In addition to Tranter and Interscope, GLAAD also helped with the single. Proceeds from the song were donated to the Equality Florida Pulse Victims Fund, the GLBT Community Center of Central Florida and GLAAD.

Background 
"Hands" was conceived by Tranter the following day after the Orlando nightclub shooting occurred. In an interview with Billboard, Tranter stated that each musician was "assigned [...] what we thought would be the best part for their voice".  Eventually, over two dozen artists assisted in the making of "Hands", which was released as a download on July 6, 2016. Interscope Records handled the release, with assistance from GLAAD.

Artists involved 
Source: Billboard

 Justin Tranter
 Julia Michaels
 Imagine Dragons
 BloodPop
 Britney Spears
 Selena Gomez
 Mark Ronson
 Jennifer Lopez
 Gwen Stefani
 Kacey Musgraves
 Jason Derulo
 Meghan Trainor
 Juanes
 Pink
 Mary J. Blige
 Halsey
 Troye Sivan
 Ty Herndon
 Adam Lambert
 Trans Chorus of Los Angeles
 MNEK
 Alex Newell
 Mary Lambert
 Prince Royce
 Jussie Smollett
 Nate Ruess
 RuPaul

Track listing

Charts

Release history

References 

2010s ballads
2016 singles
2016 songs
All-star recordings
Charity singles
Gwen Stefani songs
Interscope Records singles
Orlando nightclub shooting
Pop ballads
Song recordings produced by BloodPop
Song recordings produced by Mark Ronson
Songs written by Justin Tranter
Songs written by Julia Michaels
Songs written by BloodPop
LGBT-related songs